Manuel Lozano may refer to:

 Manuel Lozano (politician)
 Manuel Rodríguez Lozano, a Mexican painter
 , an actor in the 1999 film Butterfly
 Manuel Lozano Garrido, Blessed, a Spanish writer